Rugby Klub Bratislava is a Slovakian rugby club based in Nove Mesto, Bratislava, created in 2015. They currently play in the Slovak Rugby League, and participate in friendly matches with Austrian, Czech, and Hungarian teams.

The team trains on the pitch of University of Economy in Pasienky (Športový areál Ekonomickej univerzity) on Trnavská 37, next to the Slovan football stadium. Club colors are black and green.

History

Creation
The club was established in 2015 as 'Rugby Skola v Bratislave'. The name changed to 'Rugby Klub Bratislava' a few weeks after due to legal obligations.
Club was founded by Charles Cimetiere and Christopher Bush. An citizens association 'Olympic RKB' related to Rugby Klub Bratislava was established in 2016. Its aim is to support the club and the club's activities.

Rugby life
The club features adult squad and recently developed strong rugby academy with kids of all ages. Club plays in Rugby League, Rugby Union XV and Sevens competitions. Besides that it engages in tournament and test matches in neighboring countries and hosts touring sides.

The club welcomes and accommodates both native Slovaks and expatriates with a variety of playing experiences. The club emphasises that prior rugby experience is not necessary to join.

Trainings
The club offers weekly training sessions to anyone interested in rugby. Men, women, children, of any age and experience are encouraged to contact the club for further information about joining. 

Currently, the club holds trainings sessions every Tuesday and Thursday evening. These training sessions are held primarily in English, although commands are often translated to Slovak and French too. Rugby Klub Bratislava offers a dynamic mixture of fitness, basic skills, advanced skills and team building. The aim of the training sessions are to ensure that the players are physically, mentally and strategically ready for competitive games, in a diverse and friendly community.

Competitions
The club currently plays in Slovak Rugby League, the highest rugby competition in Slovakia. It also participate in friendly Rugby League and Rugby Union matches with Austrian, Czech, and Hungarian teams

List of former players 
2021-2022

References
 Rugby Klub Bratislava - Skola Rugby
 Detský rugby turnaj v Bratislave
 Rugby: Šport gladiátorov alebo džentlmenov?
 SLOVAQUIE Le rugby existe à Bratislava et se développe avec un Français au cœur du projet
 "Charlie" Charles CIMETIERE, President and Creator of the Rugby Klub Bratislava - Skola Rugby
 Rugby School/Skola Bratislava
 1. KOLO. 1. RESPECT LIGA. second division Slovakia
 Evidence of Civil Associations

External links
 Rugby Klub Bratislava Facebook
 Rugby Klub Bratislava web site Wordpress
 Slovak Rugby League

2015 establishments in Slovakia
Rugby clubs established in 2015
Sport in Bratislava
Slovak rugby union teams